Soirococha (possibly from Quechua suyru a very long dress tracked after when worn, qucha lake,) is a  mountain at a lake of that name in the Vilcabamba mountain range in the Andes of Peru. It is located in the Cusco Region, La Convención Province, Vilcabamba District. Soirococha lies northeast of P'anta and Kima.

References

Mountains of Peru
Mountains of Cusco Region
Lakes of Peru
Lakes of Cusco Region